Greg James is a well-known tattoo artist. Greg's tattoo designs and original artwork have appeared in magazines, books, documentaries, and at the Hard Rock Cafe.

Career 
At the age of fourteen, Greg began drawing flash for his brother, Tennessee Dave, and eventually apprenticed with him in 1976. From single-needle black-and-gray work to classic Americana tattoos and ultimately the large, custom Japanese artwork for which he has become well-known, Greg tattooed continuously in Los Angeles (on Main Street in downtown L.A. and also the Pike, in Long Beach) for nine years as he continued to hone his craft.

Sunset Strip 
"I wanted to do superlative work. So, I made a choice. I would either quit tattooing or try to get in with Cliff Raven at Sunset Strip Tattoo. Cliff hired me. That's the beginning of the story."

In 1985, Greg joined Sunset Strip Tattoo in Hollywood. Originally opened by Lyle Tuttle in the 1960s, the shop was then owned by Cliff Raven and subsequently Robert Benedetti, pioneers and innovators in the Japanese style of tattooing. 

For over twenty-five years, Greg played a large part in building the stature of the legendary studio, becoming "the real star at Sunset … the tattoo artist's tattooer."

During his almost forty-year career, Greg has also apprenticed numerous other tattoo artists, including Eric Blair of Subculture Tattoo and Dollar Bill of Sunset Strip Tattoo.

Notable clients 

 Kirk Alley, owner of Eleven Eleven Tattoo
 Pat Badger, of Extreme
 Frankie Banali, of Quiet Riot
 Nuno Bettencourt, of Extreme
 Bobby Blotzer, of Ratt
 Chris Cashmore, owner of Tattoo Power, Canberra, Australia
 John Corabi, of Mötley Crüe
 Mark Dektor, director
 Sarah Michelle Gellar, actress
 Pauly Greenwood, Drummer
 Tracii Guns, of L. A. Guns
 Horicho, Japanese Tattoo Master
 Johhny Hollywood, owner of 13 Roses Tattoo Parlour
 Jesse James, West Coast Choppers
 Joan Jett
 Tommy Lee, of Mötley Crüe
 Oliver Leiber, musician and producer
 Mick Mars, of Mötley Crüe
 Vince Neil, of Mötley Crüe
 Keith Nelson, of Buckcherry
 Ozzy Osbourne
 Ashley Purdy, of Black Veil Brides
 Denise Richards
 Charlie Sheen
 Nikki Sixx, of Mötley Crüe
 Rick Stratton, makeup/special effects artist
 Joshua Todd, of Buckcherry
 Léa Vendetta, owner of Léa's Lounge

Conventions 

 Great Northwest Tattoo Convention
 Hollywood Park Tattoo Invitational
 Musink Tattoo Convention
 National Tattoo Association Convention
 New York City Tattoo Convention
 Tattoo Body Art Expo
 Tokyo Tattoo Convention

Tattoos Deluxe 

In September 2012, Greg opened his own tattoo studio, Tattoos Deluxe, in Sherman Oaks, CA (formerly Subculture Tattoo). Over time, Greg has emerged as a thoughtful and moderate spokesman for tattooing. Despite being at the top of the industry and known worldwide, Greg has also earned a reputation as "a genuinely nice guy", "quiet, modest and understated", "…one of the nicest people I've ever met, and his work is truly amazing."

Of tattooing, Greg says that "So much of what we do is really a personal thing between two people. It's not about the art so much, or the craft, or being the cool guy." "Tattooing to me is like welding. You have to lay the lines down. You're using tools. It [the tattoo] should look like it's always been there. Like it's part of your body." "You know, the average person today thinks tattoo artists nowadays are rock stars. But we go through a lot. We really put a lot effort, time, and communication into what we do. And it's permanent. You can't tear it up and throw it away when you're done with it. All these tattoos that I've done for thirty years--I carry those around in my head with me."

Documentaries 

 Skin Deep: Sunset Strip Tattoo
 Tattoo! Beauty, Art, and Pain on the Discovery Channel.
 Tattooed by Brandon Green, an independent film currently in production by Evergreenimages.

Featured artwork 

 Greg hand-painted a custom bass for Nikki Sixx of Mötley Crüe after tattooing the band while on tour with them. It's installed as Memorabilia in the Hard Rock Cafe of Tampa, Florida.
 Guitar Pick Guard artwork for The Illustrated Note.
 The Tattoo Encyclopedia: A Guide to Choosing Your Tattoo (with Terisa Green, published by Simon & Schuster, 2003) - Greg illustrated hundreds of tattoo designs for this popular book, sold globally in four languages with 50,000 copies in print. It is perennially an Amazon Top 100 bestseller in Education & Reference > Encyclopedias > Art.
 Skin & Ink Magazine (2003 - 2005) - Featured column "What Tattoos Mean" with Dr. Green.
 Ink: The Not-Just-Skin-Deep Guide to Getting a Tattoo (published by Penguin, 2005) - Contributing tattoo artist.
 Tattoo Savage Magazine - Black Veil Brides: Day of the Dead
 Tattoo Magazine - The Art of Greg James.
 Tattoo Planet Magazine

References

External links 

 13 Roses Tattoo
 Greg James, Facebook
 Kirk Alley's Eleven Eleven
 Léa Vendetta
 Pauly Greenwood
 Sunset Strip Tattoo
 Tattoos Deluxe
 Tattoos Deluxe, Facebook
 Tattoo Power
 Terisa Green TheTotalTattoo.com

American tattoo artists
Living people
Artists from California
Year of birth missing (living people)